Felipe Guaman Poma de Ayala (ca. 1535 – after 1616), also known as Huamán Poma or Wamán Poma, was a Quechua nobleman known for chronicling and denouncing the ill treatment of the natives of the Andes by the Spanish after their conquest. Today, Guamán Poma is noted for his illustrated chronicle, Nueva corónica y buen gobierno.

Biography 
The son of a noble family from the central southern Peruvian province of Lucanas located in the modern day department of Ayacucho, he was a direct descendant of the eminent indigenous conqueror and ruler Huaman-Chava-Ayauca Yarovilca-Huanuco, Felipe Guamán Poma de Ayala was a fluent speaker of several Quechua and Aru dialects, who probably learned the Spanish language as a child or adolescent. He went on to become literate in the language, although he did not achieve a perfect grasp of Spanish grammar. He described himself as "eighty years of age" in his 1615 manuscript, leading many to deduce that he was born in the year 1535, after the 1533 Spanish conquest of Peru. It seems that he used the figure "80" as a metaphor for old age, however, and many other references in his text indicate a possible birthdate of 1550 or shortly thereafter.

The information known about Guamán Poma's life comes from a variety of written sources. Most likely he was born in the Lucanas province and spent most of his life in or near Huamanga, a central Peruvian district. It is believed that the first time he left his hometown was when he served as an interpreter on the church inspection tour of a Spanish priest named Cristóbal de Albornoz, who was attempting to eliminate idolatries in the small Quechua towns. In the late 1580s to early 1590s, he was an assistant to Fray Martin de Murúa, another Spanish cleric. In 1594 he was employed by the Spanish judge of Huamanga who was in charge of land titles. In late 1600, however, all of his property was confiscated and he was banished from Huamanga, an event that led to his travels throughout the country and most likely to the composition of his masterpiece.

The Huaman Family belonged to the wealthy among the Inca Empire, before and after. As it used to be common, the marriages among the ruling families took place, to remain in control and current. At the time, the Huaman (or Waman, in Quechua; or Guaman after the Spanish conquest) were a selected family of warriors, and land owners in several regions of the pre-Inca empire. They venerated the wild bird (similar to a Falcon), that only grows in the Andean Region of Peru, above 4,000 meters above sea level.

There can be found, among the Inca's family tree lines: a) Tarco Huaman Inca, son of Inca Mayta Capac, cousin of Capac Yupanqui, and grandson of Lloque Yupanqui. b) Huaman Achachi, brother of Tupac Inca Yupanqui. c) Inca Huaman Taysi, son of Inca Rocca. d) Landowner Don Antonio Huaman Cucho, in Huamanga City, in 1570 declares ownership of several cities for the descendant of the Huaman Family as an Inca descendant.

During the occupation of the conquerors, the Huaman family, being very extensive, were fiercely prosecuted, fearing the overtake of the Andean government, the impeachment of the Hispanic occupation and land ownership claims. For this reason, most of wealth in pure gold, and ornaments were hidden and re-distributed among the descendants. Most family members moved to different areas from Peru and Ecuador. The most prominent landowners were located in Pariamarca, Santiago de Huaman, Quito and Huamanga.

There is a tale that says that direct descendants from the ruling Inca Huaman, are protected and secretly maintained as of "ready" to overtake the Peruvian empire and re-impose the supremacy of order over chaos. There are tales among the Andeans that one day the "...Hawk will fly high, where the Sun surrenders..."

Chronicles 

A handful of sixteenth-century documents attest that Guaman Poma served in the 1560s–70s as a Quechua translator for Fray Cristóbal de Albornoz in his campaign to eradicate the messianic apostasy, known as Taki Unquy, from the Christian doctrine of local believers.

Guaman Poma appeared as a plaintiff in a series of lawsuits from the late 1590s, in which he attempted to recover land and political title in the Chupas valley that he believed to be his by family right. These suits ultimately proved disastrous for him; not only did he lose the suits, but in 1600 he was stripped of all his property and forced into exile from the towns which he had once ruled as a noble.

Guaman Poma's great work was the El primer nueva corónica [sic] y buen gobierno (The First New Chronicle and Good Government), a 1,189-page document written largely in Spanish, with sections in Quechua. He wrote Corónica instead of Crónica, a form of the word common in the Middle Ages. His book remains the longest sustained critique of Spanish colonial rule produced by an indigenous subject in the entire colonial period. Written between 1600 and 1615 and addressed to King Philip III of Spain, the Corónica outlines the injustices of colonial rule and argues that the Spanish were foreign settlers in Peru. "It is our country," he said, "because God has given it to us." The king never received the document.

The Crónica is remarkable in many ways. First, it has brilliant melding of writing and fine line drawings (398 pages of the book consist of Guaman Poma's famous full-page drawings). The work also includes Guaman Poma's 'Mapa Mundi de Reino de las Indias', a cartographic representation of the Inca Empire drawn in the Mappa mundi style favored by medieval European mapmakers, which placed Cusco, the Peruvian capital, at the center of the world. Second, the manuscript expresses the view of a provincial noble on the conquest, whereas most other existing expressions of indigenous views from the colonial era come from the nobility of Cusco, the ancient capital of the Incas. Third, the author frequently uses Quechua words and phrases in this primarily Spanish work, which provided material for scholars to learn more about Quechua.

Guaman Poma proposed a new direction for the governance of Peru: a "good government" that would draw from Inca social and economic structures, European technology, and Christian theology, adapted to the practical needs of Andean peoples. He writes that indigenous governments treated their subjects far better than the Spaniards and pleads with King Phillip to instate Indians to positions of authority. It is important to note that, although he rejects Spanish rule, he does not reject the Spanish king. During that time, monarchs were typically seen as descendants of God and being strongly Catholic, Guaman Poma holds the Spanish monarch in the highest regard. In his writing, he not only wants to propose changes in society, but also to bring perceived injustices to the attention of the king, who, as representative of God, surely would not have allowed them to occur had he known.

The original manuscript of the Corónica has been kept in the Danish Royal Library since at least the early 1660s, though it only came into public view in 1908, when it was discovered by the German scholar Richard Pietschmann. After many aborted facsimile-projects, a heavily retouched facsimile edition was produced in Paris in 1936, by Paul Rivet. In 1980, a critical transcription of the book, based on autopsy of the manuscript rather than on the 1936 facsimile, was published by John Murra and Rolena Adorno (with contributions by Jorge Urioste) as Felipe Guaman Poma de Ayala, Nueva crónica y buen gobierno (Mexico City: Siglo XXI). A high-quality digital facsimile of the original manuscript was published online in 2001 by the Danish Royal Library, with Rolena Adorno as scholarly editor.

Fray Martín de Murúa and Guaman Poma 
Twentieth-century scholars had often speculated that there was some relationship between Guaman Poma's Corónica and Fray Martín de Murúa's Historia general del Piru (1616), assuming that Guaman Poma served as an informant or coauthor to Murúa. In 1967, Condarco Morales compared the texts and concluded that Guaman Poma followed Murúa's work. A direct relationship between Guaman Poma and Murúa was confirmed in 2007–2008 by a project at the Getty Research Institute. The project's principal scholars included Juan de Ossio, Thomas Cummins, and Barbara Anderson, with collaboration by Rolena Adorno and Ivan Boserup. After comparing the two existing manuscripts of Historia general del Piru (one owned by the Getty and the other by a private collector in Ireland), these scholars proved that Murúa's chronicle includes illustrations by Guaman Poma. They concluded that Guaman Poma was one of a team of scribes and artists who worked for Murúa. While Murúa's project began sometime in the 1580s, Guaman Poma became involved only as an illustrator and only shortly before 1600. Still, his contribution to Historia general del Piru is very significant. These findings were the basis of an exhibition and symposium at the Getty Center in October 2008.
 
Guaman Poma notably attacks Murúa in his Corónica, including depicting the friar's striking and kicking an indigenous woman seated at a loom. This image is entitled "The Mercedarian friar Martín de Murúa abuses his parishioners and takes justice into his own hands." According to Rolena Adorno, "...when he became an author, after 1600, [Guaman Poma] was highly critical of a work by Murúa that he had recently illustrated. Guaman Poma was prompted to write his own account against what he understood to be Murúa's limited perspective, which he had encountered in [the original manuscript of Historia general del Piru].

Guaman Poma wrote about Andean history back to the era predating the Inca. He also elaborated a long and highly critical survey of colonial society, unique among other manuscripts of the era. Guaman Poma's artistic range, displayed in his nearly 400 drawings, was based on his experience gained while working with Murúa, but it also developed in new directions.  He revealed a strong polemical and satirical bent that he directed against colonial abuses. "Although the evidence suggests that they worked independently after 1600, the efforts of Murúa and Guaman Poma can never be separated, and their talents, individually and together, produced three distinctive testimonies to the interaction between missionary author and indigenous artist-cum-author in early colonial Peru."

Name 
Guaman's name means "Falcon" or "Aguila" when translated into English and Spanish respectively. At the time, a Falcon, had the meaning of a representation of a "Supreme Existence". Someone, with the "designation" of a "Falcon" had the highest regards within the Inca and predesecing cultures. Poma's name meant "Puma" in Quechua dialect. In modern Quechua orthography, it would be spelled Waman Puma, and it is sometimes listed as such.  Other variants include Waman Poma, Huamán Poma, and Guamán Poma (the latter two with a Spanish accent; the Quechua stress is on the first syllable). In his own writing, he signed with his Quechua name put between his Spanish baptismal name, Felipe (or Phelipe, as he spelled it) and the family name of a Spanish conquistador connected to his family history, Luis Ávalos de Ayala. Guaman Poma writes about the symbolism of all his names in his book.  He seemed to consider the form of his name as a statement that his Quechua identity remained his core, although it was surrounded by Spanish names.

See also
 Fray Martín de Murúa
 Inca Garcilaso de la Vega
 Taki Unquy
 Augusto Huaman Velasco
 Huaman
 Blas Valera

References

Further reading

 Adorno, Guaman Poma: Writing and Resistance in Colonial Peru. Austin: University of Texas Press, 2000. 
 Adorno, Rolena and Ivan Boserup, "The Making of Murúa's Historia General del Piru" in The Getty Murúa: Essays on the Making of Martin de Murúa's 'Historia General del Piru,' J. Paul Getty Museum Ms. Ludwig XIII 16. Edited by Thomas Cummins and Barbara Anderson. Los Angeles: Getty Research Institute, 2008.
 Fane, Diana, ed. Converging Cultures: Art & Identity in Spanish America. New York: Harry N. Abrams, 1996. .
 Garcia Castellon, Manuel.  Guaman Poma de Ayala, pionero de la teología de la liberación. Madrid, Editorial Pliegos, 1991.
 Guaman Poma de Ayala, Felipe, author. Christopher Wentworth Dilke, ed. Letter to a King: A Peruvian Chief's Account of Life Under the Incas and Spanish Rule. Boston: E. P. Dutton, 1978. .
 Guaman Poma, The First New Chronicle and Good Government, trans. Roland Hamilton.  Austin: University of Texas Press, 2009.  
 Leibsohn, Dana, and Barbara E. Mundy, “Making Sense of the Pre-Columbian,” Vistas: Visual Culture in Spanish America, 1520–1820 (2015). http://www.fordham.edu/vistas

 Quispe-Agnoli, Rocío. La fe andina en la escritura. Identidad y resistencia en la obra de Guamán Poma de Ayala. Lima: Fondo Editorial de la Universidad Nacional Mayor de San Marcos, 2006.

External links 
 "Guaman Poma – El Primer Nueva Corónica Y Buen Gobierno" – A digital version of the Corónica, scanned from the original manuscript in the Royal Library, Copenhagen. Includes a corrected, searchable version of the critical transcription and commentary of John Murra and Rolena Adorno, coordinated throughout with the facsimile.
 The First New Chronicle and Good Government – a translation by Rolena Adorno
Más allá de los 400 años: Guamán Poma revisitado -A special monographic issue edited by Rocío Quispe-Agnoli in collaboration with Carlos García Bedoya. Letras. Revista de investigación de Letras y Ciencias Humanas de la UNMSM, 2020. It includes 12 essays and 30 analyzed images from Guaman Poma de Ayala's chronicle. DOI: https://doi.org/10.30920/letras.91.133

Spanish colonization of the Americas
Chroniclers
17th-century historians
Indigenous writers of the Americas
Inca Empire people
1550s births
17th-century deaths
Peruvian people of Quechua descent
Latin American artists of indigenous descent
16th-century indigenous painters of the Americas
Incan scholars
Peruvian translators
Nobility of the Americas